Gvozdić is a Serbo-Croatian surname, derived from the word gvozden, meaning "iron". It may refer to:

Dušan Gvozdić, basketball coach
Živko Gvozdić, Serbian soldier
Stojan Gvozdić, Serbian Orthodox cleric
Svetozar Gvozdić, Serbian politician
Pavica Gvozdić, Yugoslav pianist

Serbian surnames